Live Rushfeldt Deila (born 15 January 2000) is a Norwegian handball player who plays for Fredrikstad BK.

She also represented Norway at the 2017 European Women's U-17 Handball Championship, placing 2nd, at the 2018 Women's Youth World Handball Championship, placing 11th and at the 2019 Women's U-19 European Handball Championship, placing 2nd.

Achievements
Junior European Championship:
Silver Medalist: 2019
Youth European Championship:
Silver Medalist: 2017
Norwegian League
 Bronze: 2021/2022
Norwegian Cup
 Silver: 2022/2023

Personal life
She is the twin sister of Thale Rushfeldt Deila, who also plays in Fredrikstad BK and daughter of former international footballer Ronny Deila.

References

2000 births
Living people
Norwegian female handball players
Twin sportspeople
Norwegian twins
Sportspeople from Porsgrunn